Louis-Henri Foreau (1866-1938) was a French artist.

Foreau was a student of Jules Lefebvre, Henry Lévy, Luc-Olivier Merson and mainly of Henri Harpignies, with whom he became good friends.

From 1888 onwards he often participated in the different Salon exhibitions in France and abroad. He became a jury member of the Société des Artistes Français, and chairman of the Association des Paysagistes Français.

In his work influences from the Impressionists, the Symbolists and Barbizon movement are visible. Nevertheless, Foreau created his own style, which is characterized by a strict technique, an intense form of observation and a refined, somewhat melancholic atmosphere, which is also apparent in the work of Corot.

In his oeuvre he drew on three themes: rural life, gardens and parks and Paris and its surroundings.

19th-century French painters
French male painters
20th-century French painters
20th-century French male artists
1866 births
1938 deaths
19th-century French male artists